The Girl from Carthage (also known as La fille de Carthage) is a 1924 Tunisian film written by Haydée Tamzali and directed by Albert Samama Chikly. This film has been music composed by Mark Smythe. The film stars Hayde Chikly, Ahmed Dziri, Abdelgassen Ben Taleb and Hadj Hadi Dehali in the lead roles.

Cast
 Hayde Chikly
 Ahmed Dziri
 Abdelgassen Ben Taleb
 Hadj Hadi Dehali

References

External links
 

Arabic-language films
Tunisian short films
1924 films